Field hockey at the 2013 Southeast Asian Games was held over a nine-day period beginning on 13 December and culminated with the medal finals on 20 and 21 December 2013. All games were held at Theinphyu Hockey Field Stadium, Yangon.

Medal summary

Medal table

Participating teams

Men's tournament
All times are Myanmar Time – UTC+6:30.

Group stage

Men's Pool

Bronze medal match

Gold medal match

Final standing

Women's tournament
All times are Myanmar Time – UTC+6:30.

Group stage

Women's Pool

Fifth and sixth place match

Bronze medal match

Gold medal match

Final standing

References

Field hockey
2013
2013 in field hockey
December 2013 sports events in Asia